Dimitar Furnadjiev is a Bulgarian cellist. In 1973 he was laureated at Florence's Gaspar Cassado and Budapest's Pablo Casals competitions, and one year later he won the Bulgarian National Violoncello Competition.

He later settled in Spain. He was a member of the Orquesta Nacional de España for 16 years, and a first cellist at the Orquesta Sinfónica de Euskadi. Nowadays, he is a member of the Trío Mompou.

External links
 Profile at Música y punto (musicians directory)

Bulgarian cellists
Living people
Bulgarian expatriates in Spain
Year of birth missing (living people)